Jessville is a mansion located at 128 Pok Fu Lam Road in Pok Fu Lam, Hong Kong. The building is built in the Italian Renaissance style.

History
Jessville was built in 1929 by William Ngartse Thomas Tam, and named in honour of his wife, Jessie TO Pui-Chun.

Conservation
Facing threat of demolition, Jessville was declared a "Proposed monument" in 2007. The declaration was later withdrawn and the building was listed as a Grade III historic building.

References

External links
 

Pok Fu Lam
Houses completed in 1929
Grade III historic buildings in Hong Kong